Vilkaviškis Perlas is a professional basketball team, it is based in Vilkaviškis, Lithuania and currently competes in National Basketball League.

Current roster

Club achievements 
 2019–2020 season: RKL 1st place

References 

Vilkaviškis
Vilkaviškis
Basketball teams established in 2017
2017 establishments in Lithuania
National Basketball League (Lithuania) teams